Last Minute Marocco is a 2007 Italian comedy film directed by Francesco Falaschi.

Cast
Valerio Mastandrea as Sergio
Maria Grazia Cucinotta as Valeria
Daniele De Angelis as Valerio
Nicolas Vaporidis as Andrea
Lorenzo Balducci as Giacomo
Esther Elisha as Jasmina
Kesia Elwin as Tamu
Stefano Dionisi as Giorgio
Jamil Hammoudi as Samir
Babak Karimi as Zin Krisha
Paolo Sassanelli as Guido

References

External links

2007 films
2000s Italian-language films
2007 comedy films
Italian comedy films
Films directed by Francesco Falaschi